Highway 255 (AR 255, Ark. 255, and Hwy. 255) is a designation for two north–south state highways in Sebastian County. An eastern route of  runs north from Highway 22 through Lavaca to terminate at Highway 22 in Central City. A second route of  begins at Highway 22 in Barling and runs to US Route 64/U.S. Route 71B (US 64/US 71B).

Route description

Lavaca to Central City
Highway 255 begins at Highway 22 near Fort Chaffee and runs north to Lavaca. The route has a brief concurrency with Highway 96 along Main Street before turning southwest. The highway enters Central City and terminates at Highway 22 near the Barling city limits.

Barling to Fort Smith

Highway 255 begins at Highway 22 in Barling and runs west along the northern edge of Fort Chaffee. The route has a junction with Highway 253 shortly before entering Fort Smith. Continuing west along the southern edge of Fort Smith Regional Airport, Highway 255 has a junction with Highway 45 and an interchange with Interstate 540. The highway continues west to form a concurrency with US 71B. During the overlap US 71B/AR 255 serve as the northern terminus for US 271. Approaching the Oklahoma state line, US 71B turns north, ending the concurrency. Highway 255 continues west shortly before turning due north and paralleling the state line. The route passes Fort Smith National Cemetery, Judge Isaac C. Parker Federal Building, and Sebastian County Courthouse-Fort Smith City Hall on its way to enter downtown Fort Smith. All three properties are listed on the National Register of Historic Places (NRHP). Highway 255 crosses US 64 (Garrison Avenue) near the West Garrison Avenue Historic District before splitting into a one-way pair of streets for five blocks. Northbound traffic continues along B Street and southbound traffic runs on A Street until reuniting on Riverfront Drive. Highway 255 winds along the Arkansas River and terminates at US 64/US 71B near the bridge over the river. There are plans and current construction as of July 3, 2021 to realign Highway 255 near Chaffee Crossing to Frontier Road and the Highway 22 and Highway 59 intersection.

Major intersections
Mile markers reset at concurrencies.

|-
| align=center colspan=4 |  concurrency west,

See also

 List of state highways in Arkansas

Notes

References

External links

255
Transportation in Sebastian County, Arkansas
Fort Smith, Arkansas